Stylops is a genus of obligately endoparasitic insects in the family Stylopidae. Hosts are typically members of the order Hymenoptera. 

The name "stylops", used without a capital "s", refers as a common name to any member of the order Strepsiptera, and not only the genus Stylops.

Description 
Males are 2-3 mm long and black with white wings. Females have no limbs and are only seen from their head and thorax poking out of the host bee. Larvae are triungulin.

Life cycle 
Stylops larvae emerge from their host bee while the host gathers pollen from flowers. The larvae then attach to other bees in order to be carried back to the nest. At the nest, the Stylops larvae enter the bodies of bee larvae and develop along with their host. Adult males leave their hosts to mate with females, who remain inside their host and hatch their eggs there.

Species
Many including:
 Stylops analis Perkins, 1918
 Stylops andrenaphilus Luna de Carvalho, 1974
 Stylops ater Reichert, 1914
 Stylops aterrimus Newport, 1851
 Stylops borcherti Luna de Carvalho, 1974
 Stylops dalii Curtis, 1828
 Stylops deserticola Medvedev, 1970
 Stylops dinizi Luna de Carvalho, 1974
 Stylops friesei Kirby, 1802
 Stylops gwynanae Günther, 1957
 Stylops hammella Perkins, 1918
 Stylops ibericus Luna de Carvalho, 1969
 Stylops kinzelbachi Luna de Carvalho, 1974
 Stylops liliputanus Luna de Carvalho, 1974
 Stylops lusohispanicus Luna de Carvalho, 1974
 Stylops madrilensis Luna de Carvalho, 1974
 Stylops maxillaris Pasteels, 1949
 Stylops melittae Kirby, 1802
 Stylops moniliaphagus Luna de Carvalho, 1974
 Stylops nevinsoni Perkins, 1918
 Stylops obenbergeri Ogloblin, 1923
 Stylops obsoletus Luna de Carvalho, 1974
 Stylops pacificus Bohart, 1936
 Stylops paracuellus Luna de Carvalho, 1974
 Stylops pasteelsi Luna de Carvalho, 1974
 Stylops praecocis Luna de Carvalho, 1974
 Stylops risleri Kinzelbach, 1967
 Stylops ruthenicus Schkaff, 1925
 Stylops salamancanus Luna de Carvalho, 1974
 Stylops spreta Perkins, 1918
 Stylops thwaitesi Perkins, 1918
 Stylops ventricosae Pierce, 1909
 Stylops warnckei Luna de Carvalho, 1974

In popular culture 
The official seal, and later logo, of the Royal Entomological Society features a male Stylops.

References

Strepsiptera
Insect genera
Taxa named by William Kirby (entomologist)
Parasitic insects